Francesco Ricchino was an Italian architect of the Renaissance period, born in Rovato and mainly active in his native Brescia.

Biography
He was a pupil of Alessandro Bonvicino. He painted scenes for the chancel of the church of San Pietro in Oliveto in Brescia. He is known also as a poet. The biographer Cristiani describes him as an architect working for the Elector of Saxony. He cites two sources claiming he died after may 1571 (Three letter to Hippolito Chizzola in the archives of Fam.Ducco, march and may 1571, Brescia).

References

16th-century Italian painters
Italian male painters
Italian Renaissance painters
Painters from Brescia
16th-century Italian architects
Italian Renaissance architects
Architects from Brescia
Year of death unknown
Year of birth unknown